Experimental biology is the set of approaches in the field of biology concerned with the conduction of experiments to investigate and understand biological phenomena. The term is opposed to theoretical biology which is concerned with the mathematical modelling and abstractions of the biological systems. Due to the complexity of the investigated systems, biology is primarily an experimental science. However, as a consequence of the modern increase in computational power, it is now becoming more feasible to find approximate solutions and validate mathematical models of complex living organisms.

The methods employed in experimental biology are numerous and of different nature including molecular, biochemical, biophysical, microscopical and microbiological. See :Category:Laboratory techniques for a list of biological experimental techniques.

Gallery

References

Biological techniques and tools
Branches of biology